Philippe Nguyễn Kim Điền  was a Vietnamese prelate. He was Archbishop of Huế during the country's period of late 20th-Century wars and eventual reunification.

Biography
Philippe Nguyễn Kim Điền was born on March 13, 1921, in Long Đức, Vietnam. After being ordained a priest and serving as a professor and later rector of the seminary, he joined the Little Brothers of Jesus. After joining the order for sometime, Dien worked as a street cleaner and a rag picker in Saigon. He was ordained bishop in 1947, was appointed bishop of Cantho in 1961, archbishop of Pario in 1964, and archbishop of Hue in 1968.
He served as a Council Father during the Second Vatican Council on sessions one though four.

During his tenure as archbishop, he kept the Roman Catholic community together facing government efforts to control the church after Vietnam's reunification. He kept the local community strong amid seminary closures and the forced “reeducation” of many priests. The Vietnamese government formed the “Committee for the Solidarity of Patriotic Vietnamese Catholics” in 1983, attempting to separate the Vietnamese Roman Catholic church from Rome's papal authority.  Điền was opposed to this committee and was placed under house arrest in 1984 until his death in 1988.
During his house arrest, he continued to circulate letters among parishioners “and the authorities apparently made no serious attempt to replace him”. Priests and nuns were reported to have been arrested for distributing his statements clandestinely in Vietnam. These were also smuggled abroad. Điền was highly regarded in Vietnam. He was never a fervent anti-communist; he was a "priest of the people" who embraced the social reforms that came as a result of Vatican II. He was however critical of the government's policies and denounced the restrictions on Mass and other religious ceremonies, the anti-Catholic message children received in school and the fact that Catholics were discriminated against when seeking employment. At one point during his tenure, he was placed under surveillance and two priests under his authority were arrested.

Being under house arrest prevented him from attending the 1986 Vatican Congregation for the Evangelization of Peoples; this prohibition would merit a formal protest from cardinals and bishops from 40 countries.
Điền died of an illness in hospital in Ho Chi Minh City on June 8, 1988.

His tomb is located to the left inside the Phủ Cam Cathedral in Huế.

Điền  was a priest for 40.8 years and a bishop for 27.3 years.

References 

1921 births
1988 deaths
20th-century Roman Catholic bishops in Vietnam